Earl of Iddesleigh, in the County of Devon, is a title in the Peerage of the United Kingdom. It was created in 1885 for the Conservative politician Sir Stafford Northcote, 8th Baronet, of Pynes in the parish of  Upton Pyne near Exeter in Devon and lord of the manor of Iddesleigh, 28 miles north-west of Pynes. He served as President of the Board of Trade, Secretary of State for India, Chancellor of the Exchequer, First Lord of the Treasury and Foreign Secretary and was Joint Leader of the Conservative Party from 1881 to 1885. Northcote was made Viscount St Cyres, of Newton Saint Cyres in the County of Devon, at the same time he was given the earldom. This title is also in the Peerage of the United Kingdom.

He was succeeded by his eldest son, the second Earl. He notably served as Chairman of the Board of Inland Revenue, and a Justice of the peace and deputy lieutenant in Devonshire. On his death the titles passed to his nephew, the third Earl. He was the youngest son of John Stafford Northcote, third son of the first Earl. His eldest son, the fourth Earl, served as a Deputy Lieutenant of Devon.  the titles are held by the latter's only son, the fifth Earl, who succeeded in 2004.

The Northcote Baronetcy, of Haynes in the County of Devon, was created in the Baronetage of England in 1641 for John Northcote. He represented Ashburton, Devon and Barnstaple in the House of Commons. His grandson, the third Baronet (who succeeded his father), died childless in 1709 and was succeeded by his younger brother, the fourth Baronet. He was a Medical Doctor. His son, the fifth Baronet, sat as Member of Parliament for Exeter. His great-great-grandson was the aforementioned eighth Baronet, who was elevated to the peerage in 1885.

Two other members of the Northcote family have also gained distinction. Henry Northcote, second son of the first Earl, was created Baron Northcote in 1899 and served as Governor-General of Australia from 1904 to 1908. Sir Geoffry Northcote, Governor of Hong Kong from 1937 to 1941, was the son of Arthur Francis Northcote, fourth son of the first Earl.

The title of the earldom is pronounced "Id-sly" while the family surname is pronounced "Northcut".

The family seat is Shillands House, near Exeter, Devon.

Northcote Baronets, of Hayne (1641)
Sir John Northcote, 1st Baronet (1600–1676)
Sir Arthur Northcote, 2nd Baronet (1628–1688)
Sir Francis Northcote, 3rd Baronet (1659–1709)
Sir Henry Northcote, 4th Baronet (1667–1730)
Sir Henry Northcote, 5th Baronet (1710–1743)
Sir Stafford Northcote, 6th Baronet (1736–1770)
Sir Stafford Henry Northcote, 7th Baronet (1762–1851)
Sir Stafford Henry Northcote, 8th Baronet (1818–1887) (created Earl of Iddesleigh in 1885)

Earls of Iddesleigh (1885)
Stafford Henry Northcote, 1st Earl of Iddesleigh (1818–1887)
Walter Stafford Northcote, 2nd Earl of Iddesleigh (1845–1927)
Stafford Harry Northcote, Viscount Saint Cyres (1869–1926), predeceased his father 
Henry Stafford Northcote, 3rd Earl of Iddesleigh (1901–1970)
Stafford Henry Northcote, 4th Earl of Iddesleigh (1932–2004)
John Stafford Northcote, 5th Earl of Iddesleigh (b. 1957)

Present Earl
The present holder of the peerages is John Stafford Northcote, 5th Earl of Iddesleigh (born 15 February 1957). The only son of the 4th Earl and his wife Maria Luisa Alvarez-Builla y Urquijo, Contesa del Real Agrado, he was educated at Downside School and the Royal Agricultural College and was styled as Viscount St Cyres between 1970 and 2004. 
On 14 May 1983, he married firstly Fiona Caroline Elizabeth Wakefield, a daughter of Paul A. C. Wakefield. They were divorced in 1999, and on 9 June 2000 he married secondly Maria Ann Akaylar Lakin, daughter of John Lakin. With his first wife he has two children:
 Thomas Stafford Northcote, Viscount St Cyres (born 1985), the heir apparent; and
Lady Elizabeth Rose Adèle Northcote (born 1989)
In 2003, Lord St Cyres was living at Hayne Barton, Newton St Cyres. On 8 July 2004, he succeeded to the peerages and the baronetcy.

Line of Succession
Only those in positions (1) to (6) are in line to the Earldom. All others are only in line to the Baronetcy.

  Sir John Northcote of Hayne, 1st Baronet (d. c. 1676)
  Sir Arthur Northcote, 2nd Baronet (1628–1688)
  Sir Francis Northcote, 3rd Baronet (1655–1709)
  Sir Henry Northcote, 4th Baronet (1655–1729/30)
  Sir Henry Northcote, 5th Baronet (1710–1743)
  Sir Stafford Northcote, 6th Baronet (1736–1770)
  Sir Stafford Henry Northcote, 7th Baronet (1762–1851)
 Henry Stafford Northcote (1792–1850)
  Stafford Henry Northcote, 1st Earl of Iddesleigh (1818–1887)
  Walter Stafford Northcote, 2nd Earl of Iddesleigh (1845–1927)
 Stafford Harry Northcote, Viscount Saint Cyres (1869–1926)
  Henry Stafford Northcote, 1st Baron Northcote (1846–1911)
 John Stafford Northcote (1850–1920)
  Henry Stafford Northcote, 3rd Earl of Iddesleigh (1901–1970)
  Stafford Henry Northcote, 4th Earl of Iddesleigh (1932–2004)
  John Stafford Northcote, 5th Earl of Iddesleigh (b. 1957)
 (1) Thomas Stafford Northcote, Viscount Saint Cyres (b. 1985)
 Edward Frederic Northcote (1934–2006)
 (2) Edward Bede Robert Hornby Northcote (b. 1964)
 (3) Robert Henry Basil Northcote (b. 2000)
 (4) Alexander Benet Paul Hornby Northcote (b. 1971)
 (5) Anthony Theodore Robert Michael Northcote (b. 2004)
 Arthur Francis Northcote (1852–1943)
 Sir Geoffry Alexander Stafford Northcote (1881–1948)
 (6) Maxwell Adams Stafford Northcote (b. 1911)
 Reverend Henry Moubray Northcote (1826–1878)
 James Alfred Northcote (1861–1928)
 Thomas Francis Northcote (1894–1977)
 (7) Peter Northcote (b. 1928)
 (8) Hugh Stafford Northcote (b. 1960)
 (9) Michael John Northcote (b. 1962)
 (10) George Arthur Northcote (b. 1929)
 (11) Charles Moubray Northcote (b. 1961)
 Reverend Stafford Charles Northcote (1796–1872)
 Lewis Stafford Northcote (1831–1882)
 Cecil Stafford Northcote (1870–1912)
 Cecil Henry Stafford Northcote (1912–2003)
 (12) Amyas Henry Stafford Northcote (1937-2020)
 (13) Hugh Cecil Camden Stafford Northcote (b. 1938)
 (14) Charles Walter Hugh Stafford Northcote (b. 1977)
 Ernest Alfred Northcote (1875–1944)
 Oliver Stafford Northcote (1906–1933)
 (15) Philip Stafford Northcote (b. 1937)
 (16) Kent Stafford Northcote (b. 1969)
 (17) Geoffrey Stafford Northcote (b. 1937)
 (18) Douglas Stafford Northcote (b. 1971)
 John Stafford Northcote (1940–c. 2000)
 (19) Stafford Oliver Northcote (b. 1975)
 Henry Northcote (b. 1738)
 Stafford Northcote (1783–1854)
 Stafford Henry Northcote (1813–1889)
 Stafford Charles Northcote (1844–1903)
 Stafford Henry Northcote (1872–1950)
 Stafford Charles Robert Northcote (1909–1977)
 (20) Stafford Robert Northcote (b. 1948)
 Geoffrey Stafford Northcote (1912–1968)
 (21) Dr. Robert Stafford Northcote (b. 1939)
 (22) Roger Stafford Northcote (b. 1966)
 (23) Dr. Bruce Stephen Northcote (b. 1969)
 (24) Alan McNeill Northcote (b. 1940)
 (25) Peter Bruce Northcote (b. 1964)
 (26) Stuart Paul Northcote (b. 1966)
 (27) Geoffrey John Northcote (b. 1947)
 Cyril Charles Stafford Northcote (1874–1946)
 John Wilfred Cyril Stafford Northcote (1904–1970)
 (28) Martin Charles Stafford Northcote (b. 1953)
 (29) Henry Charles Northcote (b. 1992)
 (30) Gillian Stafford Northcote (b. 1954)
 (31) Nigel John Stafford Northcote (b. 1960)
 (32) Andrew Alexander Stafford Northcote (b. 1964)
 Major Leonard Augustus Stafford Northcote (1879–1942)
 Major Denis Leonard Stafford Northcote (1904–1978)
 (33) William John Northcote (b. 1939)
 (34) Henry James Stafford Northcote (b. 1922)
 Leonard Beauchamp Northcote
 Henry Peter Northcote (1891–1971)
 (35) Edwin Charles Stafford Northcote (b. 1926)
 (36) Ashley James Stafford Northcote (b. 1959)
 Frederick Beauchamp Northcote (1893–1937)
 Leon Frederick James Northcote (1924–1997)
 Richard Leon Stafford Northcote (1952–1999)
 (37) Christopher Thomas Stafford Northcote (b. 1985)

References

Source

British History Online- Baronets
Line of descent of the Northcote family from Galfridus de Northcote
Northcote Manor, seat of Galfridus de Northcote

See
Baron Northcote

External links

Earldoms in the Peerage of the United Kingdom
Noble titles created in 1885
Noble titles created for UK MPs